Kabisa or Kubaysah (Arabic: كبيسة) is an Iraqi city in the Hīt district of Al-Anbar province.  

On 4 October 2014 it was captured by Islamic State forces.
On 25 March 2016 it was recaptured by Iraqi Security Forces.

References

Populated places in Al Anbar Governorate